Ramkel Lok is an Ethiopian professional footballer who plays as a forward for Welwalo Adigrat University F.C.

International career
In August 2014, coach Mariano Barreto, invited him to be a part of the Ethiopia squad for the 2015 Africa Cup of Nations qualification.

International goals
Scores and results list Ethiopia's goal tally first.

References

Living people
Ethiopian footballers
2016 African Nations Championship players
2014 African Nations Championship players
1994 births
Place of birth missing (living people)
Association football forwards
Ethiopia international footballers
Ethiopia A' international footballers
Sportspeople from Gambela Region